Fire and Steel is a 1927 American silent action film directed by Bertram Bracken and starring Jack Perrin, Philo McCullough and Mary McAllister.

Cast
 Jack Perrin as Terry O'Farrell 
 Philo McCullough as Tom Welbourne 
 Mary McAllister as Ann McGreagor 
 Burr McIntosh as Sandy McGreagor 
 Cissy Fitzgerald as Mary O'Farrell 
 Frank Newburg as G.W. Bronson
 Carmencita Johnson as Young Girl

References

Bibliography
 Munden, Kenneth White. The American Film Institute Catalog of Motion Pictures Produced in the United States, Part 1. University of California Press, 1997.

External links

1927 films
1920s action films
American action films
Films directed by Bertram Bracken
American silent feature films
American black-and-white films
1920s English-language films
1920s American films